Nossa Senhora das Dores is a municipality located in the Brazilian state of Sergipe. Its population was 26,795 (2020) and its area is 471 km².

It is named after 'Nossa Senhora das Dores', which translates to 'Our lady of Sorrows', referring to Mary, mother of Jesus.

References

Municipalities in Sergipe